This is a list of museums in Suriname. Suriname is a small country on the north-eastern coast of South America, and a former Dutch colony.

Paramaribo 
 Geological Museum - Museum dedicated to geology and mining in Suriname, located in the Geological Mining Service building (Geologische Mijnbouwkundige Dienst), Jaggernath Lachmonstraat, Paramaribo.
 Koto Museum - History and culture museum dedicated to Afro-Surinamese culture (notably traditional costumes). Prinsessestraat 43, Paramaribo.
 Lalla Rookh Museum - History and culture museum dedicated to Indo-Surinamese culture. Lalla Rookhweg 54, Paramaribo. (Lalla Rookh was the name of the first ship to transport Indian indentured workers from British India to the Dutch colony of Suriname, and about two-thirds of them stayed on after their 5-year contracts had ended.)
 Maritime Museum - Located in the building of the Maritime Authority of Suriname (MAS), Cornelis Jongbawstraat 2, Paramaribo.
 Numismatic Museum of the Central Bank, dedicated to the history of Surinamese currency, located in the building of the Central Bank of Suriname, Mr. F.H.R. Lim A Po straat 7, Paramaribo.
 Sports Hall of Fame Suriname - Museum dedicated to the sports heroes of Suriname. Located in the building of the Suriname Olympic Committee, Letitia Vriesdelaan, Paramaribo.
 Surinamese Museum (Surinaams Museum)- General history and culture museum of Suriname, located in Fort Zeelandia, Abraham Crijnssenweg 1, Paramaribo.
 Surinamese Rum House - Small museum dedicated to the history of rum production, Cornelis Jongbawstraat 18, Paramaribo.
 Villa Zapakara - Surinamese history and culture museum for children, Prins Hendrikstraat nr 17b, Paramaribo.

Commewijne 
 Fort Nieuw-Amsterdam - Historical open-air museum located in Commewijne.
 Museum Bakkie - History and culture museum on plantation Bakkie (Reijnsdorp), Bakkie, Commewijne District.
 Telecommunication museum, Nieuw Amsterdam, Commewijne.

Coronie 
Mangrove Education Center - Education Center dedicated to mangroves, located in the former fire station in Totness, Coronie.

Marowijne 
Contemporary Art Museum Moengo/Marowijne Art Park - Located in Moengo, Marowijne.

Saramacca 
 Saamaka Marron Museum - Historie and culture museum dedicated to Maroon culture, located in the village Pikin Slee, Saramacca.

See also 
 List of museums by country

References

External links 

 Eerste lustrum voor MUSEUMN8 in Suriname. waterkant.net,  11 May 2018. 
 Expositieruimtes in Suriname. Federation of Visual Artists in Suriname (FVAS). 

Suriname
 
Museums
Suriname
Museums